Blue Streak O'Neil is a 1926 American silent Western film directed by Paul Hurst and starring Al Hoxie, Ione Reed and Cliff Lyons. Location shooting took place in at the Sequoia National Park in California.

Cast
 Al Hoxie as Blue Streak O'Neil
 Pardner the Horse as O'Neil's Horse
 Ione Reed
 Alfred Hewston
 Cliff Lyons
 Paul Hurst

References

External links
 

1926 films
1926 Western (genre) films
American black-and-white films
Films directed by Paul Hurst
Silent American Western (genre) films
1920s English-language films
1920s American films